The discography of the Japanese girl group Morning Musume consists of sixteen studio albums, five compilation albums, and seventy singles. Ever since its establishment in 1997, the group has experienced frequent line-up changes, and currently consists of twelve members: Mizuki Fukumura (leader), Erina Ikuta (sub-leader), Ayumi Ishida (sub-leader), Sakura Oda, Miki Nonaka, Maria Makino, Akane Haga, Reina Yokoyama, Rio Kitagawa, Homare Okamura, Mei Yamazaki and Rio Sakurai. The group was formed by Sharam Q vocalist Tsunku, who serves as their lyricist, composer, and producer.

Albums

Studio albums 

* Billboard Japan Top Albums is published since January 2009

Notes

Extended plays

Soundtracks

Musicals

Compilation albums 

Notes

Tribute and cover albums

Other appearances

Singles 

* Billboard Japan Hot 100 is published since January 2008.
** These are unofficial figures obtained by adding together Oricon sales numbers for different periods of time when the single charted on Oricon.

Digital singles

Collaboration singles

Videography

Music video compilations

Concerts

Music videos

Video Games 
[January 11, 2001] Space Venus starring Morning Musume (Playstation 2)

Footnotes

References

External links 
Official Morning Musume discography page on the Hello! Project official website 

Discography
Discographies of Japanese artists
Pop music group discographies